Ǧbargoláy  is the third month of the Afghan calendar. It occurs from May 21/22 to June 20/21, and it has 31 days.

Ǧbargoláy associates with the tropical Zodiac sign Gemini. Ǧbargoláy literally means "twin" in Pashto.

Events

Observances 
 Victoria Day - First Monday of  Ǧbargolay
 Memorial Day - First or Second Monday of Ǧbargolay nearest to or on May 31 in the Gregorian
 Canadian Armed Forces Day - Third Sunday of Ǧbargolay
 Queen's Official Birthday - Fourth Saturday of Ǧbargolay
 Festa della Repubblica - 12 or 13 Ǧbargolay
 Constitution Day (Denmark) - 15 Ǧbargolay (14 in leap years)
 National Day of Sweden - 16 Ǧbargolay
 Russia Day and Independence Day (Philippines) - 22 Ǧbargolay
 Flag Day (United States) - 24 or 25 Ǧbargolay

Pashto names for the months of the Solar Hijri calendar

ps:غبرګولی(مياشت)